A bobbin is a spindle or cylinder on which wire, yarn, thread or film is wound. 

Bobbin or Bobbins may also refer to:

 The Bobbin, Clapham, London, a pub and a Grade II listed building
 Bobbin, a village in the municipality of Glowe, Germany
 Betsy Bobbin, a fictional character in L. Frank Baum's Land of Oz
 Tim Bobbin, pseudonym of English caricaturist and satirical poet John Collier (1708–1786)
 Arum maculatum, a plant species also known as "bobbins"
 Bobbins (webcomic), written by John Allison
 Bobbin (batteries), a construction type of cylindrical batteries

See also
 Bobin (disambiguation)